Mark Johnson (born 7 February 1966) is a British thoroughbred horse racing announcer in both the United States and United Kingdom.

Born in Skegness, Lincolnshire, Johnson attended King Alfred's College in Winchester, Hampshire  and London College of Printing in Elephant and Castle, London receiving a bachelor's degree in television, film, and theatre studies, and a postgraduate diploma in radio journalism.  His first race commentary was in 1986 at Tweseldown Racecourse in Fleet, Hampshire.  In 1995, he called his first Classic, the St. Leger Stakes at Doncaster Racecourse in South Yorkshire, and as of May 2009, had announced eleven St. Legers, and five Epsom Derbies.  He has also announced multiple Cheltenham Gold Cup and Grand National steeplechase races.

Following the unexpected death of announcer, Luke Kruytbosch, Johnson became the track announcer at Churchill Downs in Louisville, Kentucky in January 2009, calling his first Kentucky Derby later that year after being selected amongst five announcers who called different weeks in the 2008 Fall Meet. This made him the first announcer to have called The Epsom Derby and The Kentucky Derby. He also did paddock commentary with Jill Byrne at Churchill Downs. His tenure ended in the Fall Meet of 2013 in what Churchill described as an "amicable parting".

Johnson has covered fences 1/17 - 4/20 and fences 10/26 - Anchor Bridge crossing in the Grand National for ITV on terrestrial television from 2017. He's also covered the race for Racing UK (now Racing TV).

References
 http://www.bbc.co.uk/programmes/b01s7t3p Radio 4 Saturday Live interview  Saturday 4 May 2013 0900hrs

External links
 Meet Mark Johnson (Churchill Downs)

1966 births
Alumni of the University of Winchester
British horse racing writers and broadcasters
Living people
People from Skegness